Justin Clemens (born 22 April 1969) is an Australian academic known for his work on Alain Badiou, psychoanalysis, European philosophy, and contemporary Australian art and literature. He is also a published poet.

Background
Clemens studied at the University of Melbourne, gaining his PhD on "Institution, aesthetics, nihilism : the Romanticism of contemporary theory" in 1999.

He then lectured in Psychoanalytic Studies at Deakin University, before moving to the School of Culture and Communication at the University of Melbourne in the late 2000s where he is Senior Lecturer.

Clemens is art critic for the Australian magazine The Monthly. He has a daughter.

Scholarly contributions
In his extensive published work, he writes on psychoanalysis, contemporary European philosophy, and literature. Clemens has also published poetry and prose fiction.

Selected bibliography
Translated books and articles
 Badiou, Alain, "On a Contemporary Usage of Frege", trans. Justin Clemens and Sam Gillespie, UMBR(a), no. 1, 2000, pp. 99–115.
Infinite Thought: Truth and the Return to Philosophy. Translated and edited by Justin Clemens & Oliver Feltham, (London: Continuum, 2003):  (paperback);  (hardcover)
 
Creative works
(poetry) The Mundiad. (Melbourne: Black, Inc. Publishing, 2004) 
(novella) Black River. With collages by Helen Johnson, (Melbourne: re.press, 2007) 
(poetry) Villain. (Melbourne: Hunter Contemporary Australian Poets, 2009)

Authored books
The Romanticism of Contemporary Theory: Institutions, Aesthetics, Nihilism. (Aldershot: Ashgate Publishing, 2003)
Avoiding the Subject: Media, Culture and the Object. (Amsterdam: Amsterdam University Press, 2004)
Psychoanalysis is an Antiphilosophy (Edinburgh: Edinburgh University Press, forthcoming May 2013)

Co-authored books
Lacan, Deleuze, Badiou. A.J. Bartlett, Justin Clemens, Jon Roffe, (Edinburgh University Press, 2014)

Edited collections and books
 Jaques Lacan and the Other Side of Psychoanalysis: Reflections on Seminar XVII. Clemens & R. Grigg (eds.), (Durham: Duke University Press, 2006).
 The Praxis of Alain Badiou. Paul Ashton, A. J. Bartlett, Justin Clemens (eds.), (Melbourne: re.press, 2006).
The Work of Giorgio Agamben: Law, Literature, Life. Edited with Nicholas Heron and Alex Murray. (Edinburgh: Edinburgh University Press, hardback: 2008; paperback: 2011).
Badiou: Key Concepts.  Bartlett & Clemens (eds.), (London: Acumen, 2010). Contributions from various Badiou scholars and translators including, along with Clemens and Bartlett, Bruno Bosteels, Ray Brassier, Oliver Feltham, Z.L. Fraser, Sigi Jottkandt, Nina Power, and Alberto Toscano  
The Jacqueline Rose Reader. Edited by Clemens & Ben Naparstek (Durham, NC: Duke University Press, 2011)

References

External links
Contributor's Index at The Monthly this page has nearly 2 dozen links to essays and articles by Clemens on a wide variety of topics covering politics, society, and culture
Manifesto of Virtual Art 2010 by Clemens, Adam Nash and Christopher Dodds
Breaking the silence on a great mind In this essay first appearing in April 2010, Clemens discusses Albert Camus and reviews the book Albert Camus: Elements of a Life by Robert Zaretsky 
Dürer: Innsbruck 1495 a poem by Clemens appearing in Jacket (2009) 
You Have the Right to Remain Silent In this on-line essay from the journal Heat, Clemens gives "a passionate analysis of torture and its relation to the freedom of speech" 
6 Sonnets from Ten Thousand Fcuking Monkeys includes some poems from an early Clemens publication
Lion Camel Child Clemens' second collection of poetry available here complete in a pdf version
This is Not a Love Song Clemens' Lecture on Psychoanalysis at the Garage Blackboard Lectures in 2012

1969 births
20th-century Australian male writers
20th-century Australian non-fiction writers
20th-century Australian philosophers
20th-century Australian poets
20th-century Australian short story writers
20th-century essayists
20th-century translators
21st-century Australian male writers
21st-century Australian non-fiction writers
21st-century Australian philosophers
21st-century Australian poets
21st-century Australian short story writers
21st-century essayists
21st-century translators
Analytic philosophers
Australian male non-fiction writers
Australian translators
Critical theorists
French–English translators
Living people
Mass media theorists
Media critics
Philosophers of art
Philosophers of culture
Philosophers of law
Philosophers of literature
Philosophers of nihilism
Philosophers of psychology
Philosophy academics
Philosophy writers
Political philosophers
Social philosophers
University of Melbourne alumni
Academic staff of the University of Melbourne
Writers about activism and social change